Muttaburra Airport  is a small airstrip in the remote town of Muttaburra in the state of Queensland, Australia.

Its main use is for bringing in supplies, but it is also used by the Royal Flying Doctor Service of Australia and some of the local property owners that hire a plane because they don't have their own airstrip or plane to fly to major cities or towns to go shopping and get more supplies.

See also
 List of airports in Queensland

References

Airports in Queensland